NTF2-related export protein 1 is a protein that in humans is encoded by the NXT1 gene.

The protein encoded by this gene is located in the nuclear envelope. It has protein similarity to nuclear transport factor 2. This protein functions as a nuclear export factor in both RAN (Ras-related nuclear protein)- and CRM1 (required for chromosome region maintenance)-dependent pathways. It is found to stimulate the export of U1 snRNA in RAN- and CRM1-dependent pathways and the export of tRNA and mRNA in a CRM1-independent pathway. The encoded protein heterodimerizes with Tap protein and may regulate the ability of Tap protein to mediate nuclear mRNA export. The use of alternate polyadenylation sites has been found for this gene.

References

Further reading